Non-blocking or nonblocking may refer to:
non-blocking I/O, see asynchronous I/O
Non-blocking synchronization
Nonblocking minimal spanning switch